Misgar is a village and valley situated in the northern end of Pakistan. It is on the edge of Hunza District in Gilgit-Baltistan where Pakistan border China and Afghanistan. In recent years, it is also the base for an easy and fascinating trek to Kilik Pass and Mintaka Pass, two Silk Road passes to Tarim Basin in China.

History

Kilik Pass and Mintaka Pass north of the town are part of the ancient Silk Road. They were the usual caravan route from Pakistan and India to Tashkurgan before the opening of the Karakoram Highway.

The current settlements of Misgar in Misgar valley was established since at least 1844. Around that time it was settled by people from four tribes who came from Hunza.

British Raj took control of the area in 1892 as part of their efforts during the Great Game. They constructed a fort in Misgar in 1930s to control the Wakhan Corridor -- Qalandarchi Fort. It is now a local landmark. Misgar remained part of Hunza until independence of Pakistan in 1947.

References

External links

 The Misgar Community - The Information Junction of Misgar

Populated places in Hunza District
Valleys of Gilgit-Baltistan
Villages in Pakistan